Thou is a commune in the Loiret department of the Centre-Val de Loire region in north-central France.

Architecture
Despite its size, Thou  features  many  castles  of various  centuries:

 Le château de la Chaise
 Le château de Linière
 Le château de Thou
 Le château du Puys

Economy

As a rural commune, Thou is strongly agricultural with cattle and poultry farming and cereal crops. There is also a hôtel-restaurant, a garage and most importantly a local metalwork industry, Thou Industrie / Beaulieu Industrie.

See also
Communes of the Loiret department

References

Communes of Loiret